The Spanish missions in Louisiana were religious outposts in Spanish Louisiana (La Luisiana) region of the Viceroyalty of New Spain, located within the present-day U.S. states of Louisiana and East Texas.

They were established by Spanish missionaries for Indian Reductions of the local Native Americans.

Mission Nuestra Señora de los Dolores de los Ais
Mission Nuestra Señora de los Dolores de los Ais was named for the indigenous Ais people, a former local tribe.

It was established in 1716–1717 by the Domingo Ramón-St. Denis expedition, and ceased operations in 1773.  Its site is in San Augustine, Texas

Mission San Miguel de Linares de los Adaes
Mission San Miguel de Linares de los Adaes was the fifth mission established in eastern Tejas in 1716–1717. At that time the Spanish claimed the Red River to be the eastern boundary of New Spain, so the mission was considered part of Spanish Texas, despite the fact that New France claimed the Sabine River as the western boundary of La Louisiane.

The mission was attacked by French soldiers in 1719 and was abandoned.  Three years later, the Marquis de San Miguel de Aguayo, Governor of Coahuila and Tejas when they were part of the Viceroyalty of New Spain, reopened the mission, but at a location closer to the Presidio of Los Adaes.  The mission remained open until 1773.

See also
On Spanish Missions in neighboring regions:
 Spanish missions in Florida
 Spanish missions in Georgia
 Spanish missions in Texas

On general missionary history:
 Catholic Church and the Age of Discovery

On colonial Spanish American history:
 Louisiana (New Spain)
 Louisiana (New France)
 Spanish Texas
 Spanish colonization of the Americas

References

Louisiana (New Spain)
Spanish missions in the United States
Pre-statehood history of Louisiana
Colonial Mexico
Spanish colonization of the Americas
Spanish-American culture in Louisiana